Malaybalay, officially the City of Malaybalay (Bukid and Higaonon: Bánuwa ta Malaybaláy), is a 1st class component city and capital of the province of Bukidnon, Philippines. According to the 2020 census, it has a population of 190,712 people.

The city, dubbed as the "South Summer Capital of the Philippines", is bordered north by Impasugong; west by Lantapan; south by Valencia and San Fernando; and east by Cabanglasan and Agusan del Sur.

It was formerly part of the province of Misamis Oriental as a municipal district in the late 19th century. When the special province of Agusan (now Agusan del Norte and Agusan del Sur) and its sub-province (Bukidnon) were created in 1907, Malaybalay was designated as the capital of Bukidnon. It was then formally established as a municipality on October 19, 1907, and was created into a city on February 11, 1998, by virtue of Republic Act 8490.

Malaybalay City is the venue of the Kaamulan Festival, held annually from mid-February to March 10.

History 
Historiographic accounts for Malaybalay are scarce, and conflicting narratives further obscure the actual history of the city due to the oral nature of passing information by the indigenous peoples and the incomplete accounts of Spanish registries in the region.

Precolonial history 
Malaybalay is one of the few villages in central Mindanao that was founded by the natives. People who lived in the present-day Malaybalay and indeed most of Northern Mindanao and parts of Caraga now call themselves Higaonon. Higaonon tribal chieftains claim a city was built at the confluence (sabangán) of the Kibalabag and Can-ayan Rivers, at which point the Tagoloan River begins and is considered a sacred place by the tribe. They never converted to Islam like the tribes in Cotabato and Lanao.

Spanish period, 17th to 19th century 

The Spanish, who arrived in the area in the 18th century, already saw thriving communities along the Tagoloan River. In 1815, the Province of Misamis was created, which included areas of present-day Bukidnon. However, some skirmishes with the Spanish administration existed, such as the burning of Kalasungay village in 1850 by Spanish authorities, although the cause of such incident is conflicting. Nonetheless it dispersed the survivors into neighboring villages such as Silae and Silipon (now Dalwangan). A group established a new settlement near the Sacub River (a spring near present-day Rizal Park), led by Datù Mampaalong. In 15 June 1877, in an accord between the Spanish government and Mampaalong with 30 other datù, their settlement called Malaybalay was incorporated into Misamis. At the same event, Mampaalong and his people embraced Christianity. Spanish registries incorporated Malaybalay as the pueblo Oroquieta, in the town of Sevilla (now Mailag), administered by the clergy. Other settlements, namely Kalasungay (Calasungay), Linabo, Silae, Valencia, Bugcaon, Alanib (Covadonga), Monserrat (may refer to either Lumbayao or Lurugan), and Lepanto (probably Maramag) were also incorporated into the town in separate occasions. Although Mailag was the designated town proper by the Spanish government, it was Linabo that served as the seat of town government. Malaybalay was then a barrio headed by an appointed cabeza de barangay.

American occupation, 1898-1946 
During the American occupation, administrative structure of Mindanao underwent complete overhaul. The Province of Misamis was dissolved forming the current provinces of Misamis Occidental and Misamis Oriental. Likewise, the Philippine Commission then headed by Commissioner Dean C. Worcester, Secretary of Interior and a member of the Philippine Commission proposed the creation of a province of Bukidnon. With it, the local administration of Sevilla was considered defunct.

On August 20, 1907, the Philippine Commission Act No. 1693 was enacted creating the sub-province of Bukidnon. Malaybalay was then formally created as a municipality on October 19, 1907, replacing Mailag. It included the barrios of the former Sevilla except for Maramag, which became a separate Municipality. Dalwangan, formerly a village under Sumilao during the Spanish administration, was also incorporated within Malaybalay. When Bukidnon was declared as a regular province and become an independent political unit on March 10, 1917, by virtue of the creation of the Department of Mindanao and Sulu under Act 2711, Malaybalay was designated as its provincial capital.

World War II and Japanese occupation, 1942-1945 

During the Second World War, in 1942, the Japanese occupation troops entered Bukidnon. They occupied Malaybalay, establishing a camp in Casisang. Guerrilla groups operating around Malaybalay made frequent raids on the Japanese camps from the time of the occupation until the arrival of the Americans. In 1945 American liberation forces, together with the Philippine Commonwealth Forces and Filipino guerrillas, liberated Malaybalay.

Postwar Malaybalay 
Malaybalay was one of the few municipalities and municipal districts comprising Bukidnon and in the decades that followed, several municipalities were created from Malaybalay's far-flung but populous barangays. These municipalities eventually became San Fernando (1959, from 8 barrios), Valencia (1961, from 13 barrios), Lantapan (1968, from 12 barrios), and Cabanglasan (1979, from 15 barrios). As the capital town, most economic activity was centered here until it shifted to the more centrally located Valencia, its daughter town. In 1980, Valencia overtook Malaybalay as the most populous municipality.

Cityhood

On March 26, 1996, the Sangguniang Bayan of the municipality of Malaybalay passed Resolution No. 3699-96 petitioning to the House of Representatives for the conversion of Malaybalay into a city. Reginaldo Tilanduca, 2nd District Representative of Bukidnon at that time, filed House Bill No. 6275, proposing the creation of Malaybalay into a component city. On February 11, 1998, President Fidel Ramos signed the act (R.A. 8490) that converted Malaybalay to a city, making it the first component city of Bukidnon.

Geography 
Malaybalay City, the capital city of Bukidnon, is in the central part of the province. It is bounded in the east by the municipality of Cabanglasan and the Pantaron Range, which separates Bukidnon from the provinces of Agusan del Sur and Davao del Norte; on the west by the municipality of Lantapan and Mount Kitanglad; on the north by the municipality of Impasugong; and on the south by Valencia City and the municipality of San Fernando.

The whole eastern and southeastern border adjoining Agusan del Sur and Davao del Norte is elevated and densely forested mountains, which is one of the few remaining forest blocks of Mindanao. The nearest seaports and airports are in Cagayan de Oro, which is 91 kilometers away.

Barangays 

Malaybalay City is politically subdivided into 46 barangays. The barangays are conveniently grouped into 5 geographical districts, namely the Poblacion District, North Highway District, South Highway District, Basakan District, and Upper Pulangi District.

Climate 
The climate classification of Malaybalay City falls under the Fourth Type or intermediate B type, which is characterized by the absence of a pronounced maximum period and dry season. Outside these months, January to March receive less rain and October to December are intermediate. Compared with the rest of the country, the climate in Malaybalay is moderate all year round and the area is not on the typhoon belt.

Land area 

An estimated of 65% of this is classified as forestland/timberland and the remaining 35% is alienable and disposable areas: lands which could be used for purposes such as for agriculture or for industry.

The city plays a strategic role in the protection of the headwater source of the Pulangi and the Tagoloan rivers because of its location the upper portion of both watershed areas. The Pulangi River then extends through the Cotabato provinces as the Rio Grande de Mindanao and to Cotabato City, where it empties into Illana Bay. The Tagoloan River, on the other hand, traverses northwestward toward Tagoloan, Misamis Oriental, where it joins the Macajalar Bay. These watershed areas provided potable water, irrigation, hydro-electric power, and recreation and tourism activities.

Topography and soil type 

About 60% of the city's area has above 30% slope, characterized by steep hills, mountains, and cliff-like stream side. About 25% are level, gently sloping, and undulating. The rest are rolling and hilly.

One of prominent geographical structure in the city is the Kitanglad Mountain Range, located in the western frontier, on its border with Lantapan and Impasugong. Some barangays (Dalwangan, Capitan Bayong, Imbayao and Mampayag) are in the foothills of this mountain range. Steep hills are found in the central portion of the city (Kibalabag, Manalog and Can-ayan), where the Tagoloan River headwater can be found. The Central Mindanao Cordillera (Pantaron Mountain Range), is on the eastern side of the city, in its boundaries with Agusan del Sur province. The Pulangi River cuts across the area between the hills in the central part and the Central Cordillera in the eastern part, creating a portion of the Upper Pulangi river valley. The southern portion of the city is made up of level to undulating area, a river valley created by the Sawaga River and the Manupali River, which are both tributaries of the Pulangi River.

About 66% of the city's soil is identified as undifferentiated mountain soil and the rest are clay. The predominant types of clay are Kidapawan, Alimodian and Adtuyon, which are generally good for agriculture.

Demography 

Malaybalay is originally the home of the Bukidnon "lumads" or natives, but there has been an influx of settlers and immigrants from the Visayas and Luzon for the last four decades contributing to the growth of the population. The original inhabitants, the Bukidnons, have retreated to the hinterlands as the migrants continued to occupy and dominate the population centers in the city. Malaybalay City is the second most populous political subdivision in the province, after Valencia City.

The historical growth of population of the city showed a variable pattern of growth (See Figure). The first census of population was made in 1918 with Malaybalay having only 16,428 inhabitants. The 21 years from 1918 to 1939 was a low-growth period with the city's population growing at a 0.6% annually. This was then followed by a period of population decline until the post-World War II era, declining by 1.5% per year. The 12-year period from 1948 to 1960 is a period of high growth, when the city's population almost doubled from its 1948 level. This pace of growth continued until 1970, growing 6.7%. In 1970, Malaybalay has 65,918 inhabitants. A 5-year period of declining growth followed, the population dropped to 60,779. After the decline, Malaybalay's population has been increasing since then, growing by 3.4% from 1990 to 1995 and by 1.9% from 1995 to 2000.

The city is predominantly rural, with only 16% of the population in urban areas, 40% in urbanizing barangays and 46% in rural areas. Population is evenly distributed in the urban and rural areas. The urban areas are generally found on the confines of the Sayre Highway (also known in the city as "Fortich Street") that traverses the city. The main urban population is found in the Poblacion-Casisang-Sumpong area. Secondary population centers includes barangays Aglayan, Bangcud, Kalasungay and San Jose.

Malaybalay has one of the lowest average population density in the province, second only to Impasug-ong with only 146 persons per square kilometer although there are barangays, especially in the Poblacion area, with high population density.

Cebuano and Binukid are prevailing mediums of communication in the city. More than half of the city's population are speakers of these languages. Other languages such as Maranao are spoken by the Maranaos. Hiligaynon is also spoken by the descendants of the Hiligaynon/Ilonggo settlers in the city.

Religion 

The majority of the population, about 77% of the population, follow Christianity, with Roman Catholicism as the largest religion. Malaybalay is the center of the Diocese of Malaybalay which covers the province of Bukidnon (except for the municipality of Malitbog which is under the Archdiocese of Cagayan de Oro), the municipality of Wao, Lanao del Sur, and Barangay Buda in Davao City. It covers an area of 8, 294 square kilometers. San Isidro the Farmer Cathedral is the largest church in the city which is located beside Plaza Rizal. Other Christian religions present are United Methodist, Baptists, Seventh Day Adventists, Born again, Iglesia ni Cristo and the UCCP.

The remainder 23% belong to non-Christian faiths, mainly adherent of Islam. The believers of Islam are mainly Maranao and Balik Islam. There are many mosques that can be found in the city. Malaybalay Grand Mosque is the largest mosque in the city which also serves as the Islamic Center of Bukidnon. There are also sizeable adherents of Buddhism and animism in the city.

Economy 

The city is mainly an agricultural area, and its products include rice, corn, sugarcane, vegetables, legumes, root crops and commercial crops such as rubber, coffee, banana and pineapple. During the past years, corn used to be the pre-dominant crop in the city. But as the corn areas gave way to sugarcane, agri-farms (poultry, hog), and residential areas, sugarcane (306,600 metric tons) and rice (30,318 MT) came out now as the predominant crops in terms of production volume. These products are usually sold in the local market, or in nearby municipalities of the province. There are also farmers producing larger volume of corn and rice who sell their products in Cagayan de Oro.
Agri-based industries primarily poultry and piggery, now flourish in the city. These farms are assisted by big corporations such as San Miguel, Purefoods, Monterey and Swift. Other agri-based industries in the City include Asian Hybrid Philippines (feeds processing), Rubber Tex (rubber shoes manufacturing), and Monastery Farms (peanuts and other preserved foods). Also notable are the 12 cattle ranches that produce an average of 470 heads yearly.

Data from the License Department of the City showed that a majority or 95.87% of the establishments in the City belong to the service sector. Looking at the breakdown, sari-sari stores (37%) make up majority of the establishments in this sector, followed by trade/wholesale/retails (21%) and other, social and personal services (14%). Industry Sector and Agriculture Sector only make up only 2.27% and 1.9% respectively of all establishments.
There is no data available on the employment per sector from the NSO that is specific for Malaybalay City, thus the CPDO collected data from DTI, License Department, and City Agriculture Office to get the distribution of employment per industrial sector. The result showed that 70% of employment is in the farming/ crop production sector followed by government agencies and commercial/private establishments. Agri-industries and service sectors registered only about 1.63% and 5.99% respectively. The lowest is the manufacturing/processing sector at only 0.36%.
So far 3 spring resorts, 5 plazas/nature parks have been developed in the city. Other natural sites such as forest, industrial tree plantation sites, mountains, falls, rivers and caves are still to be developed for eco-tourism.

Culture

Malaybalay City Charter Day Taking place every March 22, the date is declared as a special working holiday through Republic Act 8813 as a commemoration of Malaybalay's anniversary as a chartered city. Events are lined up by the city to enable residents and visitors to come and experience the charter day activities.

Malaybalay City Fiesta Malaybalay City Fiesta takes place every May 15 in honor of the city's patron saint, Saint Isidro Labrador, the patron of agricultural workers, labourers and livestock. The fiesta is a two-day event starting May 14, a day before the fiesta, wherein residents actively prepare for the festivities, up to fiesta day proper (May 15).

Kaamulan Festival Kaamulan Festival is an ethnic cultural festival held annually in Malaybalay City, Bukidnon in the Philippines from the second half of February to March 10, the anniversary date of the foundation of Bukidnon as a province in 1917. It is held to celebrate the culture and tradition of the seven ethnic tribal groups—Bukidnon, Higaonon, Talaandig, Manobo, Matigsalug, Tigwahanon and Umayamnon—that originally inhabit the province. It is the only ethnic festival in the Philippines.

Tourism
Malaybalay has several notable tourist destinations.

Monastery of Transfiguration The city's 25-year Benedictine Monastery of Transfiguration on San Jose hill, is made of heavy lime blocks, designed by National Artist for architecture Leandro Locsin. The first Filipino Abbot, Fr. Eduardo Africa and former Malaybalay bishop Gaudencio Rosales inaugurated it on August 6, 1983. Today, 10 monks had its 7 hectares planted to rice, 25 hectares to corn, and the rest for planting the world-famous Monk's Blend Premium coffee. Its two-story Museum of Transfiguration Monastery (MTM) houses Dom Martin's 50-piece vestment collection included in Philippines' 1998 centennial celebration. The Worship and Weave book on the vestments won the 2001 National Book Award (art category).

Nasuli Spring Located in Barangay Bangcud, this spring has blue waters deep enough for diving and swimming. It also serves as picnic grounds for families.

Bukidnon Forests Inc., (BFI) industrial tree plantation This 39,000-hectare reforestation project (21,000 hectares of which are plantable) demonstrates the compatibility of nature with economic objectives. Funded with the assistance of the New Zealand government under the auspices of DENR, the project has been operational since 1990. The City of Malaybalay and the municipalities of Impasugong, Manolo Fortich and Malitbog are the areas covered by the plantation. Its 5-hectare nursery is capable of producing 5.2 million fast-growing seedlings every year.

Kaamulan Grounds Located at Barangay 1, Kaamulan Grounds serves as an activity area, refuge and recollection, picnic and other outdoor activities. The Folk Arts Theater, where some provincial activities and events are held, is also found here.

Carmelite Monastery The Carmelite Sister's Monastery is a place for retreat and prayer. It is at Pal-ing, Barangay Patpat; some 5 km from the city proper bound to the west.

Mt. Capistrano Famous as the evacuation area in World War II, this mountain is characterized by its rock formations and caves. Nature trekkers and mountain climbers find a good spot at the top, albeit rough and sharp, to see a vista of Bukidnon's grandeur as it offers views of the nearby mountains and the acres of rice and cornfields. Located at Barangay Managok, it is 18 km from the City of Malaybalay proper bound south.

Roxas Monument Roxas Monument is a historical park whose principal feature is the monument of the Philippine's first president of the independent Republic, Manuel Roxas. History has it that President Roxas hid secretly in the old school, now known as Casisang Central Integrated School, after escaping from Japanese Imperial Army at the height of World War II on his way to Australia. The monument was erected in honor of Roxas’ brief stay as well as to remember the WWII prisoners of war. The Roxas Monument is located at Casisang, Malaybalay – a few minutes ride going South from the city proper.

Dalwangan Centennial Marker This is the spot identified to be where the Northern and Southern Army of the US Air Force linked in World War II. The centennial marker is erected at Barangay Dalwangan, City of Malaybalay.

Torre ni David (David's Tower) Is a popular edifice along the highway of Cabangahan, Malaybalay City. This old three-storey house was built in 1962 by David Valmorida. An old article which was featured in Inquirer.net in 2007 reported that there are some strange and unexplained occurrences in this house.

Ereccion de Pueblo The monument of creation of the town is proudly standing at Plaza Rizal. It depicts the 1877 agreement between the Spanish Colonizers and local leaders such as Datu Mampaalong

D' Stable Eco Resort (Quadra) D' Stable Eco Resort is more popularly known as Quadra. It is located in Santa Cruz, Sumpong, Malaybalay City, close to Shepherds Meadow Memorial Park. Quadra has a ranch-like setting, with a horses, stables, huts and cottages built on grassy grounds and a mountain view backdrop. Accommodation and horseback riding may also be available.

Two Trees The Two Trees is a part of the Provincial Tree Park of Bukidnon, which the Northern Entrance is at the Kaamulan Grounds and its Southern Entrance is at Gawad Kalinga (also known as Capitol Village), Barangay 9. The Park is traversed by the Kalawaig River, a tributary of Sawaga River, the major river of Malaybalay City (except in the Upper Pulangi District where the Pulangi River reigns), which starts at Barangay 1.

Monastery of Carmelite Nuns The monastery nuns provide an environment of natural attractions with its grounds as well as spiritual blessings of peace renewal.

Jesuit Retreat House Primarily a retreat center, its well kept grounds being on the banks of a creek offer the intrepid a climbing experience amidst a mini rainforest ambiance. It is owned by the Jesuits.

MKAETDC or The Mt. Kitanglad Agriculture and Ecological Center Is a Gawad Saka 2006 First place Winner for showcasing an ecological and agricultural all organic, all natural lifestyle. This is a site for bird watching, trekking, camping, fishing and eco-walk. Being situated at the foothill of Mr. Kitanglad, a rare flight of the Bukidnon eagle could be in your sights as you walk along misty eco- trails with a cool temperature to equal that of Trinidad valley in Mt. Province. The site hosts conferences and seminars.

Lapanday Farm The sweetest pineapples exported fresh are from this Filipino agri-corporation. Its plantations are located in different sites and the headquarters are found not more than a 10-minute drive from the city's commercial section. This is owned by the Lorenzo family, a name long associated with the pineapples and agriculture.

Nomiarc and Stock Farm This area is the site of farm showcases where animals of good stocks (bred) and high value vegetables are seeded and tested for research by government technicians.

Nature Park and Swimming Pool This natural attraction features scenic environs the site of a varied flora and fauna, providing varied environmental activities of which bird watching is one. A swimming pool and another for children welcome the daring to try clean, coolest water. Located at Kimambong, Barangay Sumpong

Hernandez Ranch Owned privately by the Hernandez family, the site was developed with horseback riding trails, swimming pools and fishing grounds.

Q Park II Here's a new place ideal for prayer and reflection in Bukidnon, Mindanao, Philippines. Q Park II, located at Barangay Kalasungay, Malaybalay City, boasts of a lawn, a view of the Bukidnon mountain ranges and Malaybalay's signature cool breeze. An alternative to the Monastery of Transfiguration, which is also located in Malaybalay. Admission to Q Park II is free and this park is open from 9 am to 5 pm, Tuesday to Sunday. Closed on Mondays.

Matin-ao Spring Resort Matin-ao resort is located about 21 kilometers from Malaybalay City proper and 8 kilometers away from Valencia City. Compared to Nasuli, Matin-ao has more shallow areas making it a safe place to swim for children.

Sports

Available sports venues in the city include basketball courts, 1 bowling alley, 1 pelota court, and 10 tennis courts. All barangays in the city have at least one basketball court. With a total of 60 basketball courts, there are some barangays with 2 or more basketball courts. The recent resurgence of Badminton as a favorite sport has created 4 new facilities in this field of recreation including the former Belyca Cinema.

There are 4 gymnasium/auditorium, which are used for sports events as well as other public programs or gatherings. The former Faro Cinema was converted into a military base camp. Most people go to Valencia or Cagayan de Oro to watch movies in theaters.

Malaybalay will also be the site of the province-owned Bukidnon Sports and Cultural Complex which would be built in barangay Laguitas. It will include a track oval, swimming pool and other associated facilities.

There are 4 spring resorts located in Bangcud & Managok and 4 plazas or parks. Aside from these, well-maintained public open spaces for leisure and recreation have yet to be developed in the city.

The Bukidnon Provincial Zoological Park was opened in 2019 at the Kaamulan Grounds.

Government

City administration 
The city is administered by the City Mayor together with the Vice Mayor and the Sangguniang Panlungsod. The mayor is the local chief executive officer of the city and exercises control and supervision over all local administrative offices as mandated by the Local government code of the philippines (1991). The city also has a City Administrator that assists the mayor.

The Sangguniang Panlungsod (or SP) serves as the local legislative arm of the city. It enacts ordinances and issues regulations that are necessary to promote the propriety and general welfare of the city's residents; ensure the health, safety, comfort and convenience of its constituents, maintain peace and order, improve and promote high public morals, and ensure the protection of the properties within the city's jurisdiction. There are 12 elected Sangguniang members and a permanent Sangguniang Panlungsod secretary. The Sangguniang Panlungsod is headed by the Vice Mayor, acting as its presiding officer. There are twelve (12) elected Sanggunian members and one permanent Sangguniang Panlungsod secretary.

Malaybalay City 46 barangays each headed by a barangay chairman together with seven Sangguniang Barangay members.

Infrastructure

Transportation 

Roads and highways

There are about 820.89 kilometers of road linking the different parts of the city. 102.70 km or 12.51% are classified as National Road, 60.40 km or 7.36% Provincial Road, 61.35 km or 7.47% City Road, and 596.44 km or 72.66% barangay roads. About 14.14% of all roads in the city are paved, that is, either concrete or asphalt. These are in the poblacion areas. At least 85.86% are unpaved (gravel or earth filled). These are primarily the barangay roads. These unpaved roads leading to the rural barangays usually require regular maintenance since they are easily destroyed by heavy rains. There are also logging roads leading to the forestal communities, but these are usually passable by farm animals and single motor cycles only, making it hard for communities to transport products into the market.

Connecting the various road networks and cutting across rivers and creeks are at least 22 bridges of various types. Almost all of these bridges are said to be in good condition. There are 15 bridges or 69.35% totaling to about 470.67 m in length that are administered nationally, while 3 bridges of about 115.00 m are under the province's administration. Only about 93.00 m or about 13.70% are under the administration of city and barangays.

The Sayre Highway bisects the Poblacion, the main urban center of the city, serving as the main thoroughfare of the city. Buses that ply the Cagayan de Oro, General Santos, Butuan and Davao City route, as well as jeepneys, multi-cabs, vans and private vehicles pass through this highway. Suburbs are served by multicabs, motorelas and improvised bicycles (trisikads).

The current main highway in the city center is now congested. Heavy traffic and congestion has been observed in the main highway, especially during peak hours. The absence of proper and adequate parking areas further contributes to the congestion. The situation underlies the need for a bypass road as well as more traffic aides. The city has two proposed roads to answer the above concerns. The first proposal is the Circumferential Road from Sumpong to DPWH Depot in Casisang, which is 2.5 km. in length. The other is the by-pass road from Dalwangan to San Jose with a total stretch of 15 km. The Butuan-Malaybalay Road becomes the secondary road connecting Esperanza, Agusan del Sur, which is scheduled to complete in the future.

Public transportation
There are various types of public transportation. Buses that ply the Bukidnon, Cagayan de Oro, General Santos, Butuan and Davao City route are used for travel from the city to other provinces. There are also mini-vans that transport passengers from Cagayan de Oro to Malaybalay. The multi-cabs ply the main highway from the poblacion proper to other points of destination within the city and nearby barangays. The four-wheeled motorelas are limited to the inner streets. Recently, tri-sikads have also begun to operate in the inner streets of Barangay Sumpong. Jeepneys are usually used for travel from the poblacion to other barangays and municipalities. In far-flung areas, motorcycles (habal-habal) are the fastest means of transportation.

The main terminal for public transportation vehicles is in the public market, especially for buses, mini-vans, and jeepneys. For motorelas and tri-sikads, street-corners of convergence serve as terminals or waiting areas.

With the increase in traffic of both vehicles and pedestrians, especially in the poblacion, there is a growing concern for better and safer organized streets. There is a need to designate walking pavements or pedestrian lanes, including pedestrian overpass especially for the use of children and students crossing the major highway.

Airports and seaports
Malaybalay City once had an airport located at Barangay Casisang but closed in the 1990s by the provincial government to give land for housing; the nearest one is the Laguindingan Airport in Cagayan de Oro. The city also relies on the Cagayan de Oro seaport for the delivery of its products to other destinations in the Philippines as it is the closest port to the city.

Housing Development
To close the housing gap of 6.5 million between 2017 and 2020, the government needs to build 250,000 houses a year. Currently, however, the housing sector can only build 203,000 to 205,000 units annually between 2016 and 2019.

Housing developments in Malaybalay includes Lumina Homes, Greenfields Subdivision, Dumalahay Subdivision, and Legacie Country Homes.

Utilities 

Electricity
All the 46 barangays are already energized. Majority or 57.07% of the city's households have electricity for lighting. 39.88% of households still use kerosene.

Malaybalay is served by the Bukidnon Second Electric Cooperative Incorporated or BUSECO, which started its operations in 1979 (Table 77: Number of Connections by Type of Users and Average Consumption). Recent data from BUSECO indicate a total of 16,157 power connections. Of these 14,107 or 87.31% are residential connections, while 1,454 or 9.00% are commercial establishments.

While the number of household connections is 9 times more than the combined industrial and commercial connections, the average monthly consumption of households is 3.06% less than the latter. In actual number, businesses use at least 73,560.39 kWh per month more than households. This trend is not surprising because businesses tend to use more electricity than households.

However, the data underlines the need to plan ahead to ensure that there is enough power supply for the city's growing power demands. Already, at least 43% of the population remains without electricity and those who do have experience regular power outage. This sector needs attention especially with the expected increase in population as well as business establishments.

Water

The water system and services of Malaybalay is provided by Malaybalay City Water District (MCWD) in which its office is located in Barangay Sumpong.

Telecommunications, Media and Courier Services
There are 2 major telephone companies in the city, the Southern Telecommunications Company (SOTELCO) and Philcom. Both Philcom and Sotelco offer Internet connections. Mobile phone services available in the city include Globe, Smart, TM and Sun. With the growing demand for better communication systems companies are facing the challenge of providing better and higher quality services to the population.

Broadcast media include 5 radio and 2 television repeater stations, including a cable station. Most national dailies such as the Philippine Daily Inquirer and Philippine Star are available. Local newspapers include the Bukidnon Newswatch, Gold Star Daily and Bukidnon Plateau.

There are 4 major courier services available in the city for national and international forwarding. The post office, the Bureau of Telecommunication and 2 telegraphic companies serve other communication needs.

The telecommunication technologies have continued to improve over the years. But the mode of communication in the upland barangays are still the old and tested letter sending through vehicle drivers and broadcasting over the public radio stations.

The city's mobile and internet services are provided by Globe Telecom, PLDT, Parasat Cable TV and Smart Communications.

Law enforcement 
The Malaybalay Police Station is responsible for the protection of the city's population against crime. Data for year 2005 indicate that the police force is 76 and serving a population of 136,210. This translates to a ratio of 1 policeman for every 1,792 persons in the city. Ideal ratio for police to population is 1:500 and the minimum standard police-population ratio is 1:1,000. In terms of area coverage, this translates to 1 policeman for every 1,424 hectares.

There are 9 police community precincts located in Sumpong, Dalwangan, Casisang, Aglayan, Managok, Bangcud, Zamboangita, Can-ayan and Barangay 9 (Public Market). The police force to population ratio is highest in Casisang with 1 policeman for every 13,874 individuals. Lowest ratio is in Sumpong with 1:151. A low ratio indicates that there are more policemen available to serve the population of a given area.

Further analysis indicates that based on the total population, the number of existing police force and the minimum police-population ratio of 1:1,000, the city still needs 606 policemen.

Malaybalay City host 2 military and police camps. One is the Camp Ramon M. Onahon, located at Barangay 7. It is the provincial headquarters of the Philippine National Police. The other one is Camp Osito Bahian, located at Impalambong, Barangay 10. It is the home of the 403rd Infantry Brigade

Barangay Public Safety Officer (BPSO) also assists in the peace-keeping efforts at the barangay level.

Medical facilities 
 Bukidnon Provincial Medical Center
 Bethel Baptist Hospital, Inc.
 Malaybalay Polymedic General Hospital
 Malaybalay Medical Hospital
 St. Jude Thaddeus General Hospital

Education

Colleges and universities 
Malaybalay City has four tertiary schools, found in the Poblacion area:
 Bukidnon State University (BSU)
 San Isidro College (SIC)
 Mindanao Arts and Technological Institute (MATI)
 STI College Malaybalay

Primary and secondary schools 

The city has 64 primary/elementary schools and 13 secondary schools, under the Division of Malaybalay City. Almost every barangay has at least one primary/elementary school, while secondary schools are strategically located in areas with higher population. Majority of the primary and secondary schools are run by the government through the Department of Education. The accompanying table lists the elementary and secondary schools in the Division of Malaybalay City.

Public Schools

Media
Parasat Cable TV and Prime Cable Network provides cable television in the city. ABS-CBN and GMA have good and clear reception. They broadcast towers are located at the peak of Mount Kitanglad, the fourth highest mountain in the Philippines and satellite dish cable TV such as Cignal TV and SatLite (replaced by Dream Satellite TV).

Radio stations have good and clear receptions in the city.

AM Stations
DXDB Radyo Totoo 594 Malaybalay (Catholic Media Network)
RMN Malaybalay (Radio Mindanao Network)

FM Stations
88.1 Radyo Bandera Malaybalay (Bandera News Philippines)
DXGH-FM 99.3 Magik FM (Century Broadcasting Network)
101.7 XFM Bukidnon (DCG Radio-TV Network)
DXBU 104.5 (Bukidnon State University) 
Praise Radio (MIT Radio-TV Network)
106.3 Love Radio Malaybalay is the major radio station in the city. 
107.1 Happy FM (Iddes Broadcast Group)

Nations newspapers are available in the city like the Philippine Daily Inquirer, Philippine Star and Manila Bulletin. The Central Mindanao Newswatch is the major local newspaper distributor.

Cities
  Valencia, Bukidnon, Philippines
  Cagayan de Oro, Philippines
  Ozamiz, Philippines
  Tandag, Philippines
  Marawi, Philippines
  Tagum, Philippines
  Baguio, Philippines
  Iligan, Philippines

International
  Ürümqi, China
  Lhasa, China

Notable personalities

 Elenito Galido – Bishop of the Roman Catholic Diocese of Iligan
 Archie Gamboa – 23rd Chief of the Philippine National Police, 2019–2020
 Teofisto Guingona III – Philippine Senator, 2010–2016
 Gerald Tabios – Elite endurance athlete
 Juan Miguel Zubiri – Philippine Senator, 2007–2011; 2016–present

See also 
 Kaamulan Festival

References

External links 

 [ Philippine Standard Geographic Code]
 Philippine Census Information

 
1907 establishments in the Philippines
Cities in Bukidnon
Mountain resorts in the Philippines
Populated places established in 1907
Populated places on the Rio Grande de Mindanao
Provincial capitals of the Philippines
Component cities in the Philippines